Centerville, also known as Little Centerville (to distinguish it from Centerville in  Leon County, Texas) is a community located in Trinity County, Texas, at the intersection of highway 94 and FM 358, 9 miles from Groveton. The town was established in the 1930s when a school was established.  The population was 400 in the 1960s, but declined in the 1970s and 1980s. The population was 60 in 2000. The school still remains and is classified by the University Interscholastic League as a "A" school.

References

Unincorporated communities in Texas
Unincorporated communities in Trinity County, Texas